This is a list of the winners of the Bavarian Film Awards Prize for Best Screenplay.

1979 Reiner Kunze
1980 Judith Herzberg, Franz Weisz
1987 Percy & Eleonore Adlon, Ulf Miehe, Klaus Richter
1989 Gabriel Barylli
1993 Uli Schwarzenberger
1994 Jan Schütte, Thomas Strittmatter
1996 Kit Hopkins
1998 Rolf Basedow, Doris Dörrie, Ruth Stadler
1999 Romuald Karmakar, Bodo Kirchhoff
2000 Don Bohlinger, Christoph Darnstädt, Mario Giordano
2001 Franziska Buch
2002 Ruth Toma
2003 Luigi Falorni, Michael Gutmann, Hans-Christian Schmid
2004 Michael Gutmann, Oskar Roehler
2005 Florian Henckel von Donnersmarck
2006 Chris Kraus
2007 Ralf Westhoff

References
https://www.stmd.bayern.de/wp-content/uploads/2020/08/Bayerische-Filmpreisträger-bis-2020.pdf

Screenwriting awards for film
Bavarian film awards